Trichirappalli Krishnasamy Ramamoorthy (15 May 1922 – 17 April 2013) was an Indian Tamil music composer and violinist.

Ramamoorthy was known as Mellisai Mannar ("The King of Light Music"), along with M. S. Viswanathan. His major works are in Tamil, Malayalam and Telugu films. He and M. S. Viswanathan, as the duo Viswanathan–Ramamoorthy, composed musical scores for over 100 films in the South Indian film industry during the 1950s and 1960s. The duo parted amicably in 1965, but eventually rejoined in 1995 after 30 years for Engirundho Vandhan.

At age 91, he died in a hospital in Chennai on 17 April 2013.

Early life
Tiruchirapalli Krishnaswamy Ramamoorthy was born in Tiruchirapalli into a family that was musically inclined. Both his Parents Krishnasamy Pillai and Nagalakshmi and grandfather, Malaikkottai Govindaswamy Pillai, were well-known violinists in Tiruchirapalli. Ramamoorthy gave several stage performances along with his father in his childhood. When he was fourteen, C. R. Subburaman noted the young boy's talent and hired him as a violinist for HMV.

Career
In the 1940s, Ramamoorthy worked in Saraswathi stores where AVM Studio's boss, Avichi Meiyappa Chettiar, was a partner in the shop. This led him to play violin for AVM's music composer, R. Sudarsanam, in some films. During these days, he also became friends with P.S. Diwakar, the pianist and music composer in the Malayala films. By the late 1940s, C. R. Subburaman, who was a rising star in the South Indian film music world, used Ramamoorthy as one of his violinists in his musical troupe. There, he met violinist and composer T. G. Lingappa, as well as M. S. Viswanathan in 1950, with whom he became a partner in later years.

Viswanathan–Ramamoorthy partnership

In 1952, C. R. Subburaman died unexpectedly, which led to Ramamoorthy and Viswanathan joining to complete the background music for the films Subburaman was working on. They were introduced by N. S. Krishnan, who knew them both fairly intimately and also their respective talents by then.

T. K. Ramamoorthy, despite being an excellent musician with an orthodox Carnatic musical background, was a shy, modest and reserved person whereas M. S. Viswanathan was naturally talented, charming, forward and dynamic even if he lacked the similar background in Carnatic music. Ramamoorthy was older than Viswanathan by six years, but the placing of their names in Viswanathan–Ramamoorthy team was agreed upon by both parties on the advice of Krishnan, who thereafter got the duo their first chance to score Krishnan's 1953 film, Panam.

The duo composed for over 100 films during the '50s and '60s, revitalising Chennai film music. The duo parted in 1965 and since then, they had composed for films individually. Although M.S. Viswanathan enjoyed a successful solo career, with over 700 films from 1965 to 2013, Ramamoorthy composed for only 19 films from 1966 to 1986.

He was awarded an honorary doctorate, along with M.S. Viswanathan, by the Sathyabama Deemed University in September 2006.

In addition, J.Jayalalithaa being the Chief Minister of Tamil Nadu, conferred the Thirai Isai Chakravarthy ("Emperors of the Cine Music") title in August 2012 and presented it to him, along with 60 gold coins and a new car.

Death
Ramamoorthy died in a hospital in Chennai following a brief illness on 17 April 2013. He was 90.

Filmography

T.K.Ramamoorthy, in association with M.S.Viswanathan, composed music for over 100 films, starting with "Panam" in 1952 up till "Aayirathil Oruvan" in 1966, under the brand name 'Viswanathan–Ramamoorthy'. After their separation in 1966, T.K Ramamoorthy composed music for these films -

References

External links
Down melody lane... from The Hindu, newspaper

1922 births
2013 deaths
Musicians from Tiruchirappalli
Tamil film score composers
Tamil musicians
Telugu film score composers
20th-century Indian musicians